Bert Louis Iannone (March 10, 1917 – February 16, 1996) was a Canadian football player who played for the Calgary Stampeders, Winnipeg Blue Bombers and Saskatchewan Roughriders. He played from 1939 to 1952. He won the Grey Cup with the Winnipeg Bluebombers in 1939 and with the Calgary Stampeders in 1948 and played in seven grey cup games. He previously played junior football in Winnipeg. He fought in the war for the Royal Canadian Navy from 1940 to 1944. He coached football for Campion College in Regina, the Regina Rams and for Saint Thomas Moore Secondary in Burnaby BC. He married Fay Iannone and had 9 children.  He died in Langley, British Columbia in 1996. He was 79 years old.

References

1917 births
1996 deaths
Canadian football people from Winnipeg
Players of Canadian football from Manitoba
Saskatchewan Roughriders players
Winnipeg Blue Bombers players
Calgary Stampeders players